The 20th Golden Horse Awards took place on November 16, 1983 at Kaohsiung Cultural Center in Kaohsiung, Taiwan.

References

20th
1983 film awards
1983 in Taiwan